Oxaline is a fungal isolate with anticancer activity in vitro. It is an O-methylated derivative of meleagrin.

References

Allyl compounds
Imidazoles
Indole alkaloids
Heterocyclic compounds with 4 rings
Lactams
Methoxy compounds